Wólka Szczecka  is a village in the administrative district of Gmina Gościeradów, within Kraśnik County, Lublin Voivodeship, in eastern Poland.

The village has a population of 170.

References

Villages in Kraśnik County